Gall Morel, O.S.B., was a poet, scholar, aesthete, and educationist, born at St. Gallen, Switzerland, on 24 March 1803; died at the Abbey of Einsiedeln on 16 December 1872. His baptismal name was Benedict, but in the monastery he took the name of Gall. In 1814, he entered the gymnasium at St. Gall. A pilgrimage to Einsiedeln in 1817 influenced him deeply, and afterwards he entered the monastery school as a novice. In 1820 he took the final vows, and after several years spent in theological and philosophical studies, was ordained priest in 1826, being appointed forthwith instructor in the monastery school. From this period his life presents a picture of extraordinary activity. From 1826 to 1832 he was professor of rhetoric, and until 1835 he lectured on philosophy. In this latter year he became librarian of the abbey, and retained this office to the end of his life, while also fulfilling the offices of choral director (1835–40), prefect (1836), and rector (1848) of the abbey school, archivist of the abbey (1839–45), counsellor of education of the Canton Schwyz (1843–5), and subprior of the abbey (1846–52).

In spite of the many demands upon his time and strength, the industrious monk exhibited a many-sided literary activity. He is best known as a poet, ten volumes of lyric, didactic, and dramatic verse testifying to his prolific poetical talent. Endowed by nature in so many directions, it has been said that in his poems, "he shows himself now as a childlike pious monk, now as a good-natured humorist, now a man fully conversant with worldly affairs, and often as a keen satirist, forceful and epigrammatic in expression." Though Morel may not rank among the princes of verse, still his modest muse produced many a poem of enduring worth. But Morel also proved himself a scholar of great versatility. Under his care the library of Einsiedeln was enriched in thirty-seven years by more than 26,000 volumes; many of these are most valuable, especially the manuscripts, which include a 10th-century manuscript of Horace, rescued by Morel from the binding of books, and named after him "Codex Morellianus". Drawing on these literary treasures, Morel published the Lateinische Hymnen des Mittelalters, Offenbarungen der Schwester Mechtild von Magdeburg, and other works. Another publication was the Regesten der Archive der schweizerischen Eidgenossenschaft, and he also compiled the Regesta of the Benedictine Abbey of Einsiedeln. Morel's compilations and catalogues are models of accuracy and arrangement. He was associate founder of the Swiss Society for Historical Research (1840), and wrote many valuable contributions for its "Archiv". He likewise assisted in the formation of "Verein der fünf alten Orte" and was a contributor to its organ, the Geschichts-freund.

In aesthetics, Morel became an authority by painstaking study and repeated art journeys to Munich, Vienna, Venice, Milan, Rome, and Paris. His conception of aesthetics was concisely expressed in the words that he considers it the prime object of aesthetics to reconstruct creation: the Divine ideas by the understanding in philosophy, the Divinely picturesque by our fancy in art, and God's creation by our will in our lives. All accomplished violinist Morel critically treated music as an important branch of aesthetics. Morel's services as an educationist for nearly fifty years are easier to estimate than to describe. His energy and his quickening influence over teachers and scholars raised the humble Klosterschule to a high rank among institutions of learning.

In this connection special mention must be made of his efforts to foster school drama, including the publication of two volumes entitled Jugend- und Schultheater. His only original dramatic work is the comedy Der Franzos im Ybrig (also known as Chevreau oder die Franzosen in Jberg, written at the age of 21 (in 1824) in the course of three or four days. The subject of the play is an invalid soldier of Napoleon's invasion Switzerland of 1798 who experiences the rather inexpert preparations for national defence on the part of the population of Iberg.

The play was an immediate success and widely performed, to the discomfort of its author often supplemented by rude or indecent additions, especially since the play remained unprinted and was spread by manual copying of the text. The first printed edition appeared only in 1917, edited by L. Hugener O. S. B. in order to "prevent further disfigurement" of the piece, the original text approximated by critical comparison of extant manuscripts. An adaptation of the play was published in 1895 by Meinrad Lienert, and an extended play loosely based on Morel was published in 1991 by Thomas Hürlimann.

Morel was highly esteemed, referred to as the "likely most universal spirit of the Einsiedeln Abbey" and by Bishop Greith of St. Gall, "Father Gall Morel was a living vindication of the monastic and cloistered life against the attacks of misunderstanding and prejudice."

References 
  
 Kühne, P. Gall, Morel, ein Mönchsleben aus dem 19. Jahrhundert, Einsiedeln, 1875, Hist.- pol. Blätter, LXXXI, 559ff.
 Leimbach, Die deutsche Dichtung der Neuzeit und der Gegenwart, VI (Leipzig, 1896), 394ff.
 H. Humm (ed.), Dreimal "Dr Franzos im Ybrig", Kulturverein Chärnehus, Einsiedeln (1992).

1803 births
1872 deaths
People from St. Gallen (city)
Swiss writers in German
Swiss Benedictines
19th-century Swiss Roman Catholic priests
Benedictine scholars
Benedictine writers
People from Einsiedeln
Burials at Einsiedeln Abbey